Attaqwa Mosque (Sometimes spelled Attakkawa Mosque; ,) or San Pa Koi Mosque, on the east side of the Ping River in Chiang Mai, is one of the seven Chinese mosques in Chiang Mai Province.

It was first built in 1967, and finished in 1969 by a group of both Chinese and non-Chinese Muslims. The mosque also houses the first Islamic school in Chiang Mai, which maintains cultural and  educational links with similar establishments in Kunming, Yunnan Province, China.

See also
Baan Haw Mosque
Islam in Thailand

References

1969 establishments in Thailand
Mosques in Chiang Mai
Mosques completed in 1969